United States Post Office-Main Branch is a historic post office building located in the University City neighborhood of Philadelphia, Pennsylvania. It is located across from Amtrak's 30th Street Station. It was built between 1931 and 1935, and is a six-story, steel frame building clad in limestone in the Art Deco-style.

The world's first scheduled rotorcraft airmail service served the Post Office. The building had been designed with a flat roof with underfloor heating to prevent snow and ice. It also had take-off ramps, radio and weather reporting equipment, and fuelling and maintenance facilities. The operation, flown by Kellett KD-1B autogyros of Eastern Air Lines, started on 6 July 1939. The main pilot was Johnny Miller. The contract ended a year later, with 2,634 flights completed, representing 85% of all scheduled flights – a very impressive statistic for the time. However, the contract was not renewed.

The facility closed on September 29, 2008 when main distribution center activities moved to a new facility adjacent to the Philadelphia International Airport.  A new retail location was opened nearby at 3000 Chestnut Street.

The building has been converted into office space, including the regional headquarters of the IRS.

It was added to the National Register of Historic Places in 2005.

References

Post office buildings on the National Register of Historic Places in Pennsylvania
Government buildings on the National Register of Historic Places in Philadelphia
Art Deco architecture in Pennsylvania
Government buildings completed in 1935
University City, Philadelphia